Alfonso Gumucio Reyes (Bolivia, 1914) was a political leader of the Movimiento Nacionalista Revolucionario (MNR) and one of its founding members in 1940. After the triumph of the Revolution of April 9, 1952, Gumucio Reyes became the President of the Corporación Boliviana de Fomento (CBF), the State institution in charge of economic development and infrastructure. As such he was responsible for several development projects, such as the Planta Industralizadora de Leche (PIL) in Cochabamba; the Ingenio Guabirá, a sugar mill in Santa Cruz; and the main roads from the highlands to the eastern part of the country, the lower lands.

From 1957 to 1960 he was appointed Ambassador to Uruguay, by President of Bolivia Hernán Siles Zuazo. From 1960 to 1964 he became Minister of Economy under the government of President Víctor Paz Estenssoro, and was responsible for the economic development of the country.

In 1964, when he had recently travelled to Spain as Bolivian Ambassador, a military coup took place in Bolivia, led by General René Barrientos. Gumucio Reyes stayed in exile in Madrid until 1967. When he came back to Bolivia, he was imprisoned by the military regime for three months.

External links
 Alfonso Gumucio Reyes page on a Gumucio family website ( ( 2009-10-25)

1914 births
1981 deaths
20th-century Bolivian people
Revolutionary Nationalist Movement politicians
Ambassadors of Bolivia to Uruguay
Ambassadors of Bolivia to Spain
Finance ministers of Bolivia